This List of fictional marsupials is subsidiary to the list of fictional animals and is a collection of various notable marsupial characters that appear in various works of fiction. It is limited to well-referenced examples in literature, film, television, comics, animation, video games and legends. This list covers all marsupials including opossums, marsupial moles, bandicoots, bilbies, wombats, koalas, kangaroos, wallaroos, wallabies and other prehistoric mammals.

Literature

Comics

Film, television and radio

Animation

Video games

Folklore and legends

Advertising mascots

References

Marsupials